Marina Makanza (born 1 July 1991 in La Tronche) is a French football player who plays for FC Fleury 91. She plays as a striker and is a France women's youth international currently playing on the senior team.

External links
 Profile at Montpellier HSC 
 
 
 Player French football stats at footofeminin.fr 
 
 
 

1991 births
Living people
Sportspeople from La Tronche
French sportspeople of Democratic Republic of the Congo descent
French women's footballers
France women's international footballers
AS Saint-Étienne (women) players
SC Freiburg (women) players
Montpellier HSC (women) players
1. FFC Turbine Potsdam players
Paris FC (women) players
Women's association football forwards
Expatriate women's footballers in Germany
French expatriate sportspeople in Germany
Division 1 Féminine players
FC Fleury 91 (women) players
Footballers from Auvergne-Rhône-Alpes
Black French sportspeople
French expatriate women's footballers